The 1948–49 Segunda División season was the 18th since its establishment and was played between 11 September 1948 and 17 April 1949.

Overview before the season
14 teams joined the league, including two relegated from the 1947–48 La Liga and two promoted from the 1947–48 Tercera División.

Relegated from La Liga
Real Sociedad
Real Gijón

Promoted from Tercera División'''
Real Santander
Gerona

Teams

League table

Results

Top goalscorers

Top goalkeepers

Relegation playoffs

Group 1

League table

Results

Group 2

League table

Results

External links
BDFútbol

Segunda División seasons
2
Spain